Maggie Creek may refer to:

Maggie Creek (South Fork Flathead River tributary), a stream in Montana
Maggie Creek (Humboldt River tributary), a stream in Nevada